Omoglymmius laticeps is a species of beetle in the subfamily Rhysodidae. It was described by R.T.Bell in 1977.

References

laticeps
Beetles described in 1977